The Stanton Masonic Lodge and School (also known as the Old Masonic Lodge and Stanton School House or the Old School House) is a historic building located in Stanton, Tennessee. It was constructed in 1871 by the Stanton Masonic Lodge, which had been chartered a few years earlier (the lodge no longer exists) The Masons provided the first floor of the building for use as a school and used the second floor for their meetings. After a public school was established by Haywood County in 1920 the building was used for a variety of other community purposes.

Some restoration of the building was undertaken beginning in 1985. The Greek Revival style building listed in the National Register of Historic Places in 1987.

References

Masonic buildings completed in 1871
Clubhouses on the National Register of Historic Places in Tennessee
School buildings on the National Register of Historic Places in Tennessee
School buildings completed in 1871
Greek Revival architecture in Tennessee
Buildings and structures in Haywood County, Tennessee
Former Masonic buildings in Tennessee
National Register of Historic Places in Haywood County, Tennessee
1871 establishments in Tennessee